Stigmella geimontani is a moth of the family Nepticulidae. It is found in the Dachstein area, a group of mountains in the north-eastern parts of the Alps.

The larvae feed on Geum montanum.

References
Josef Klimesch: Beschreibung einiger neuer Nepticula-Arten (Lep., Nepticulidae). Zeitschrift des Österreichischen Entomologischen Vereins, Band 25, 1940, Seite 79-81 und 89-94, PDF Volltext Teil 1, PDF Volltext Teil 2.
Josef Klimesch: Beiträge zur Kenntnis der Nepticulidae (Lep., Monotrysia). Zeitschrift der Arbeitsgemeinschaft Österr. Entomologen, Band 32, 1981, Seite 113-128 PDF Volltext.

External links
Fauna Europaea
Lepiforum

Nepticulidae
Moths described in 1940
Moths of Europe